The second Asian Athletics Championships were held in 1975 in Seoul, South Korea.

Medal summary

Men's events

Women's events

Medal table

External links
GBR Athletics

Asian Athletics Championships
Asian
Sport in Seoul
International athletics competitions hosted by South Korea
Asian Championships in Athletics
Asian Championships in Athletics